KGMC may refer to:

 KGMC (TV), a television station (channel 11, virtual 43) licensed to Merced, California, United States
 KOCB, a television station (channel 34 analog/33 digital) licensed to Oklahoma City, Oklahoma, United States, which used the call sign KGMC until September 1990
 Chhatrapati Shahuji Maharaj Medical University in Lucknow, India, formerly known as King George Medical College